Eumetula strebeli is a species of sea snail, a gastropod in the family Newtoniellidae, which is known from European waters. It was described by Thiele, in 1912.

The specific name strebeli is in honor of malacologist Hermann Strebel.

Description 
The maximum recorded shell length is 6 mm.

Habitat 
Minimum recorded depth is 481 m. Maximum recorded depth is 481 m.

References

Newtoniellidae
Gastropods described in 1912